Visions of Order (1964) is a posthumously-published work by conservative scholar Richard M. Weaver which argues that Western culture is in decline because many of its intellectuals refuse to believe in an underlying order of things—in the way things are, irrespective of beliefs about them.

More specific targets of Weaver's wrath in this book include: the theory of biological evolution, public education, total wars, the immanentizing of social ideals, and an over-emphasis on function over status.

1964 non-fiction books
Books published posthumously
Books by Richard M. Weaver